Shweta Basu Prasad is an Indian actress. She has acted predominantly in Hindi films and television. She won the National Film Award for Best Child Artist for her role in Makdee.

Personal life 
Shweta Basu Prasad was born in Jamshedpur, in Bihar (Now in Jharkhand), and later migrated to Mumbai with her family when she was still a child.

Shweta studied commerce at the R. N. Podar High School, Santacruz, Mumbai, and completed her graduation in mass media and journalism. She wrote columns for The Indian Express.

She added her mother's maiden name Basu to her screen name, and married filmmaker Rohit Mittal on 13 December 2018. She announced their separation on Instagram on 10 December 2019.

Career

Shweta began her career at a very tender age. She started in television but soon moved to Bollywood. Her film debut in 2002 was with a double role in Makdee for which she got the National Award for Best Child Actress. After her success on the silver screen, she got offers from television series such as Kahaani Ghar Ghar Kii and Karishma Kaa Karishma. In 2005, her talent was again recognized by director Nagesh Kukunoor and he offered her the film Iqbal, and she became a household name with the role of “Khadija” in the film. She won the Best Supporting Actress Award at the 5th Karachi International Film Festival for Iqbal.

Shweta took a break after Iqbal and continued her studies. She is a graduate in Journalism and Mass Media, and after her studies, she made a documentary on Indian Classical Music featuring the legends of the music industry. Shweta spent four years between 2012 and 2016 researching and making this documentary film, which features music giants like Shubha Mudgal, A R Rahman, Pandit Shiv Kumar Sharma, Pandit Hari Prasad Chaurasia, Vishal Bhardwaj, Amit Trivedi and Ustad Amjad Ali Khan among many other legends. The film also has a ten-minute animation bit showing a 5000-year history of Indian music. Shweta, who is herself trained in playing the Sitar, is a classical music enthusiast and made this project from her own pocket out of passion, and this documentary film, Roots, is now available on Netflix.

Shweta made her debut in Telugu cinema in 2008, with the film Kotha Bangaru Lokam. She has made eight movies in Tamil, Telugu, and Bengali.

Apart from films and television, Shweta has explored behind-the-camera work and worked as a script consultant at Phantom Films.

In September 2014, Shweta was arrested from a hotel in Hyderabad after a police raid. She was detained by the police on charges of prostitution, and sent to a rescue home,
where she was held for two months.
In December, the Metropolitan Sessions Court, Nampally, Hyderabad, withdrew all charges against her. After her release, she issued an open letter to the media clarifying as false and misleading, a statement attributed to her by a journalist at the time of the arrest. In the letter, she said during the time of the arrest, she was attending the Santosham Film Awards event and staying at the hotel arranged by the organizers.

Shweta made her grand comeback with the Balaji Telefilms television series Chandra Nandni as leading actress Nandni, and her next Hindi film outing was Badrinath Ki Dulhania by Dharma Productions.

Shweta played a rookie journalist and central protagonist in The Tashkent Files, a suspense drama thriller based on the death of India's Second Prime Minister Lal Bahadur Shastri. She received critical praise and acclaim from critics and audiences alike. The film was received well commercially and has been hailed as a surprise box office success of 2019, after successfully making a 50-day Box Office run.

Filmography

Films

Television and web series

Awards

References

External links

 
 

Living people
Indian film actresses
Actresses from Jharkhand
21st-century Indian actresses
Actresses in Tamil cinema
Actresses from Bihar
People from Jamshedpur
21st-century Indian child actresses
Actresses in Telugu cinema
Actresses in Bengali cinema
Actresses in Hindi cinema
Actresses in Hindi television
Child actresses in Hindi cinema
Best Child Artist National Film Award winners
Screen Awards winners
Zee Cine Awards winners
Actresses in Telugu television
Santosham Film Awards winners
Year of birth missing (living people)